Nowruzan (also Romanized as Nowrūzān and Naurūzān) is a village in Kavar Rural District, in the Central District of Kavar County, Fars Province, Iran. At the 2006 census, its population was 3,332, in 698 families.

References 

Populated places in Kavar County